The 1984 MTV Video Music Awards aired live on September 14, 1984. The inaugural ceremony honored the best music videos released between May 2, 1983 and May 2, 1984, and was hosted by Dan Aykroyd and Bette Midler at the Radio City Music Hall in New York City.

Herbie Hancock was the show's most-awarded artist, taking home five awards, followed by Michael Jackson, who won three. The main award, Video of the Year, went to The Cars for "You Might Think". This was the first instance of only a few in the show's history where the video of the year did not win any other awards. Hancock's "Rockit" and The Polices "Every Breath You Take" were the most-nominated videos, receiving eight nominations apiece. Cyndi Lauper was the most-nominated artist of the night, with nine overall for two of her videos: six for "Girls Just Want to Have Fun", which eventually won the Moonman for Best Female Video, and three for "Time After Time".

Other major nominees included Jackson and The Cars, both of whom received six nominations each for their videos "Thriller" and "You Might Think" respectively; ZZ Top, who received six nominations among their videos for "Legs", "Sharp Dressed Man", and "Gimme All Your Lovin'"; and Billy Idol, who garnered five nominations for "Dancing with Myself" and "Eyes Without a Face". Lastly, David Bowie earned four nominations for his "China Girl" and "Modern Love" videos, and was also one of the honorees for the Video Vanguard award.

Background
MTV announced that it would host the first annual Video Music Awards in June 1984. Don Ohlmeyer was hired to produce the ceremony in a similar energetic fashion to his work in sports broadcasting. Dan Aykroyd and Bette Midler were announced as the ceremony's hosts in mid-July 1984. Nominees and winners were selected by 1,500 individuals representing the record industry. Following its initial MTV airing, the ceremony was syndicated to broadcast television.

Performances

Madonnas  performance of "Like a Virgin" has been referred to as one of the most "unforgettable" and "iconic" moments in both pop culture and VMA history for the singer's fashion and her "provocative moves". She emerged from a 17-foot tall wedding cake wearing a "racy", "risque", see-through wedding dress and bustier, with a silver belt buckle that read "BOY TOY". While descending the steps of the cake, one of her high heeled shoes slipped off, prompting her to dive to the floor and roll around to cover up the wardrobe malfunction. Her attempt to retrieve the shoe inadvertently led to her flashing her underwear on live television—Rolling Stone listed the moment as the sixth-most outrageous in MTV VMA history. Madonna later told Billboard after the incident, "So I thought, 'Well, I'll just pretend I meant to do this,' and I dove onto the floor and I rolled around. And, as I reached for the shoe, the dress went up. And the underpants were showing". In 2017, the outlet ranked her performance as the second-greatest award show performance of all time, saying that after her they "became the historical record; the way we remember stars at their most iconic, and the way they demonstrate their immortality".

Presenters 
 Ed Koch – proclaimed that Radio City Music Hall would be renamed "Video City Music Hall" for the night before introducing hosts Bette Midler and Dan Aykroyd
 Cyndi Lauper – read the eligibility and voting rules in gibberish described as similar to "ancient Babylonian"
 Roger Daltrey – smashed a guitar onstage while presenting the award for Best Overall Performance in a Video
 Grace Slick and Mickey Thomas – presented Best New Artist in a Video
 Ronnie Wood – presented Best Stage Performance in a Video
 Daryl Hall and John Oates – introduced the winners of the professional categories
 Peter Wolf – presented Best Choreography in a Video (with ballerina Cynthia Gregory)
 Dale Bozzio – presented Most Experimental Video
 Ric Ocasek – presented Best Group Video
 Mick Jagger – introduced the Video Vanguard award and its presenters, The Police, via pre-recorded video message
 Andy Summers and Stewart Copeland – presented Video Vanguard to The Beatles and Richard Lester
 Herbie Hancock – presented Video Vanguard to David Bowie
 John Landis – presented Best Direction in a Video
 Rod Stewart and Ronnie Wood – presented the Special Recognition Award to Quincy Jones
 Fee Waybill – presented Best Concept Video
 Billy Idol – presented Viewer's Choice
 Simon Le Bon and Nick Rhodes – presented Best Female Video
 Belinda Carlisle and Kathy Valentine – presented Best Male Video
 Eddie Murphy and Joe Piscopo – presented Video of the Year

Winners and nominees
Winners are listed first and highlighted in bold.

Other appearances 
 Diana Ross – accepted all three of Michael Jacksons awards on his behalf
 J. J. Jackson – appeared in a backstage segment before a commercial break
 Alan Hunter – appeared in a segment from the mezzanine after a commercial break
 John Cougar Mellencamp – interviewed by Mark Goodman from his seat before a commercial break
 David Lee Roth – interviewed by Martha Quinn from his seat before a commercial break
 Carly Simon – interviewed by Nina Blackwood backstage before a commercial break
 Iggy Pop – accepted the award for Best Male Video on behalf of David Bowie

References

External links
 
 

1984
MTV Video Music Awards
1984 in New York City